Broken Keys is a 2021 Lebanese drama film directed by Jimmy Keyrouz. It was selected as the Lebanese entry for the Best International Feature Film at the 93rd Academy Awards, but it was not nominated. The film was scheduled to premiered at the 2020 Cannes Film Festival, before the event was cancelled. The film premiered at the Jeonju International Film Festival in May 2021.

Plot
A piano player attempts to rebuild his instrument after it is destroyed by ISIS.

Cast
 Tarek Yaacoub as Karim
 Rola Beksmati as Samar
 Mounir Maasri as Abou Moussa
 Ibrahim El Kurdi as Ziad
 Julian Farhat as Abdallah
 Sara Abi Kanaan as Maya
 Badih Abou Chakra as Joseph
 Gabriel Yammine as Mounir
 Hassan Mrad as Akram
 Adel Karam as Tarek
 Fadi Abi Samra as Bassam
 Layla Kamari as Rasha
 Michel Adabachi as Ibrahim
 Said Serhan as Ahmad
 Rodrigue Sleiman as Riad

Release
In South Korea, the film earned $5,708 from 27 theaters in its opening weekend.

See also
 List of submissions to the 93rd Academy Awards for Best International Feature Film
 List of Lebanese submissions for the Academy Award for Best International Feature Film

References

External links
 

2021 films
2020s Arabic-language films
2021 war drama films
Lebanese war drama films
Drama films based on actual events
Films about Islamic State of Iraq and the Levant
Films about pianos and pianists
Films set in 2014
Films set in the Middle East
Films shot in Iraq
Films shot in Lebanon
War films based on actual events